"You're Everything" is a song by American rapper Bun B, released July 31, 2008 as the third single from his second studio album II Trill (2008). The song, produced by Mr. Lee, features fellow southern rappers Rick Ross, David Banner and 8Ball & MJG. The video was released August 6, 2008, on BET's Access Granted.

Background
In 8Ball's verse, he reels off a list of Dirty South rappers (in order) Pimp C, Bun B, 8Ball & MJG, Big Boi, André 3000 (named as Dre Three-Thou), Scarface, Willie D, T.I. (named as T.I.P.), Young Jeezy, Birdman, Lil Wayne (named as Lil Weezy), Trick Daddy, Young Buck, Jermaine Dupri, J. Prince, Juicy J, DJ Paul, Slim Thug, Lil' Keke, Chamillionaire, and Paul Wall. He also mentions record companies  So So Def (named after Jermaine Dupri) and Rap-a-Lot Records (named after J. Prince).

The song uses the drum beats of 808's and 909's.

The song uses a sample from "Cry for You" by Jodeci. Rapper E-40 sampled "You're Everything" in his song "That Candy Paint" also featuring Bun B and Slim Thug, from E-40's 2011 album Revenue Retrievin': Graveyard Shift.

Remixes
Chamillionaire did a freestyle to the song called "Do It for H Town" featuring Trae and Slim Thug for Mixtape Messiah 4, and another called "Everything" featuring Crooked I for Mixtape Messiah 6.

Charts

References

2008 singles
Bun B songs
David Banner songs
Rick Ross songs
Songs written by Rick Ross
Songs written by David Banner
2008 songs
Songs written by Bun B
Songs written by DeVante Swing
List songs